Eumellitiphis is a genus of mites in the family Laelapidae.

Species
 Eumellitiphis inouei Delfinado-Baker & Baker, 1988
 Eumellitiphis mellitus Türk, 1948
 Eumellitiphis philippinensis Delfinado-Baker & Baker, 1988

References

Laelapidae